Manoil Manufacturing Company was an American metal and plastic toy company that began production in 1935 or 1936, and left the business in 1959. From June 1940 they were located on Providence Street, in Waverly, NY (Tioga County). Its prominence was from 1937-1941 when it produced hollowcast toy soldiers (sometimes called dimestore soldiers) along with toy airplanes and cars.

Maurice Manoil (4 December 1896 – 15 September 1974) and his brother Jack (29 January 1902 – 1 September 1955) produced a variety of items from 1927 until they began making toys in 1934 in their Manhattan factory. After producing die-cast toy cars, Manoil began to produce toy soldiers in 1935. They were sculpted by Walter Baetz.

The company ceased trading in 1959.

References
 Pielin, Don, Joplin, Norman and Johnson, Verne American Dimestore Toy Soldiers and Figures 2001 Schiffer Books

Notes

Defunct toy manufacturers
Toy companies of the United States
Toy soldier manufacturing companies
Defunct companies based in New York (state)
Manufacturing companies established in 1927
Manufacturing companies disestablished in 1959
Toy brands
1927 establishments in New York (state)
1959 disestablishments in New York (state)
Design companies established in 1927
Design companies disestablished in 1959